The Inuvialuit Settlement Region, abbreviated as ISR, located in Canada's western Arctic, was designated in 1984 in the Inuvialuit Final Agreement by the Government of Canada for the Inuvialuit people. It spans  of land, mostly above the tree line, and includes several subregions: the Beaufort Sea, the Mackenzie River delta, the northern portion of Yukon ("Yukon North Slope"), and the northwest portion of the Northwest Territories. The ISR includes both Crown Lands and Inuvialuit Private Lands.

The ISR is one of the four Inuit regions of Canada, collectively known as Inuit Nunangat, represented by the Inuit Tapiriit Kanatami (ITK). The other regions include Nunatsiavut in Labrador, Nunavik in northern Quebec, and the territory of Nunavut. The ISR is the homeland of the Inuvialuit. The Inuvialuit Regional Corporation, established in 1986 as the receiver of the lands and financial compensation of the Inuvialuit Final Agreement, is controlled by the Inuvialuit population and is responsible for ISR operations. From 1996 until 2016, Nellie Cournoyea, former Premier of the Northwest Territories, was the Chair and CEO of the Board. She had been elected nine times before declining to run again. In 2016, Duane Ningaqsiq Smith, was elected to replace her and was re-elected in 2019.

The Inuvialuit Settlement Region Database contains descriptions of thousands of publications and research projects about the ISR. It is maintained by the Joint Secretariat—Inuvialuit Renewable Resource Committees and the Arctic Science and Technology Information System. Funding comes from Shell Canada and MGM Energy.

Culture

In the 2016 Canadian Census, the ISR population was 5,336 people, of which 3,110 were Inuvialuit and formed a majority in all six communities. There are no communities in the Yukon North Slope. Of the six communities in the ISR all are located in the Northwest Territories and, along with Fort McPherson and Tsiigehtchic, form the Inuvik Region.

The only other inland community, Aklavik, is located on the Peel Channel. Hunting, fishing and trapping are the major economic activities of Paulatuk, in Amundsen Gulf's Darnley Bay, and Sachs Harbour, the only permanent settlement on Banks Island. Tuktoyaktuk, formerly known as "Port Brabant", is set on Kugmallit Bay, near the Mackenzie River Delta. It has the only deepwater port in the ISR. Ulukhaktok, formerly known as "Holman", is located on the west coast of Victoria Island. Printmaking has taken over as the primary source of income in recent years. Herschel Island, which is uninhabited, is part of the ISR although in Yukon and was traditionally used by the Inuvialuit.

English is spoken in the entire region. Additionally, Siglitun is spoken in Paulatuk, Sachs Harbour and Tuktoyaktuk. Uummarmiutun is spoken in Inuvik and Aklavik. Inuinnaqtun is spoken in Ulukhaktok and nowhere else in the Northwest Territories. Together they are grouped under Inuvialuktun.

Climate

Wildlife

The Inuvialuit Renewable Resource Conservation and Management Plan sets the strategy for fish and wildlife management and conservation. Integrated management planning of the region's marine and coastal areas is described in the Beaufort Sea Integrated Management Planning Initiative. Wildlife includes Arctic char, Arctic fox, beluga whale, bearded seal, bowhead whale, caribou, moose, muskox, polar bear, ringed seal, and whitefish.

Migratory bird management within the ISR is handled by policies, principles, and regulations described in the Conservation of Migratory Birds in the Inuvialuit Settlement Region report.

Protected areas
There are several protected parks and bird sanctuaries in the ISR. There are five parks: Aulavik National Park, Herschel Island Territorial Park, Ivvavik National Park, Pingo Canadian Landmark, and Tuktut Nogait National Park. There are also four bird sanctuaries: Anderson River Delta Migratory Bird Sanctuary, Banks Island No. 1 Bird Sanctuary, Cape Perry Migratory Bird Sanctuary, and Kendall Island Migratory Bird Sanctuary

Natural resources
The area is rich in non-renewable hydrocarbon resources. There are proven commercial quantities of natural gas, nickel, petroleum, and zinc.

The ISR's Inuvialuit Private Lands are divided into those where the Inuvialuit own surface and subsurface minerals, or those lands with only surface rights.

References

External links
 Map
 Inuvialuit Regional Corporation
 Yukon ISR Lands

Geographic regions of Canada
Divided regions
Inuit territories
Populated places established in 1984
Geography of the Northwest Territories
Geography of Yukon
Inuvialuit